The Traditional Unionist Voice (TUV) is a unionist political party in Northern Ireland. In common with all other Northern Irish unionist parties, the TUV's political programme has as its sine qua non the preservation of Northern Ireland's place within the United Kingdom. A founding precept of the party is that "nothing which is morally wrong can be politically right".

The TUV was formed in December 2007 by Jim Allister after he and others had resigned from the Democratic Unionist Party (DUP) in March of that year. At the time of his resignation, Allister was a prominent figure in the DUP and held the position of Member of the European Parliament (MEP) for the party having been elected to the European Parliament in 2004. The reason for the split was DUP leader Ian Paisley's March 2007 consent to the St Andrews Agreement and his willingness to become First Minister of Northern Ireland alongside a deputy First Minister from the Irish Republican party Sinn Féin.

Prior to the St Andrews Agreement, the DUP had presented itself as an 'anti-Agreement' unionist party opposed to numerous aspects of the Good Friday Agreement e.g. the release of paramilitary prisoners before the end of their jail sentences and the participation of Sinn Féin in the Northern Ireland government without complete decommissioning of IRA weapons and cessation of all IRA activity. The TUV has been an exception among Northern Irish unionist parties in consistently opposing the presence of Sinn Féin in the Northern Ireland government. After Allister's resignation from the DUP, he continued to occupy his European Parliament seat, sitting as an Independent MEP until the following European election in 2009 when he was not re-elected.

In terms of both electoral success and financial income  Traditional Unionist Voice is the third largest unionist party in Northern Ireland, behind the Democratic Unionist Party and the Ulster Unionist Party (UUP). It is usually considered by political commentators to be a 'small party' and characterised as being more 'hardline' than other Northern Irish unionist parties.
   
Since 2011, the TUV has occupied one seat in the Northern Ireland Assembly. The party also holds a small number of seats on local councils. Its most prominent elected representative and best-known figure remains Jim Allister whose North Antrim constituency is the heartland of the party.

Since 2008, the party President of the TUV has been former East Londonderry Westminster MP William Ross.

Ideology
The Traditional Unionist Voice was founded in 2007, originally as a protest movement rather than as a political party. They announced, at the time, that it was their intention to “occupy the traditional unionist ground” which, they said, had been abandoned by the DUP when the latter party signed the St Andrews Agreement and agreed to form a government with the Irish Republican party Sinn Féin. In 2008, the TUV began to contest elections as a political party with the declared aim of building a democratic opposition to what they described as “the DUP/Sinn Fein regime”. The TUV maintains that certain aspects of the Good Friday Agreement represent a poor deal for the unionist community of Northern Ireland and refuse to accept that someone with a terrorist conviction should be allowed to hold ministerial office in the government of Northern Ireland.

Jim Allister has been the party's sole MLA since 2011. His voting record, his contributions to debates and a list of bills he has proposed in the Northern Ireland Assembly are accessible on the Assembly's Information Management portal.

The TUV focuses most of its energies upon matters relating to the unionist/nationalist political cleavage which has dominated Northern Ireland politics since 1921. Their policies on matters beyond the Northern Ireland constitutional question can fairly be described as right-of-centre and socially conservative  and they emphasise a strong attachment to 'traditional family values'.

Most of the policies in the following list can be found in all TUV election manifestos since 2009.

Economic policy
The TUV advocates an economically liberal, low taxation economy, with as much freedom of choice to the individual and small businesses as possible. They prefer that government should run a balanced budget and have been consistently critical of what they call 'Stormont Squander' of tax revenues.

Climate Change
The TUV has emphasised a continuing place for fossil fuels/hydrocarbon energy as a part of the energy mix for the economy but also support development of renewable energy sources. They believe there is a need for local recycling facilities. They see farmers as “custodians of the land” who have a part to play in the long-term conservation of the natural world.

Abortion
The TUV position on this matter is 'pro-life' and they advocate that moral issues should be matters for local decision-making.

Same-sex marriage
The TUV's position has always been that they "oppose any redefinition of marriage" and "defend traditional family values ...  believing that that is the bedrock for the success of society". They are the only party in the Northern Ireland Assembly which unequivocally holds this position.

Immigration
The TUV advocates a controlled-immigration approach with effective border checks and a 'points-style' application procedure whereby preference is given to prospective immigrants having skillsets which are in-demand in Northern Ireland.

Education
Their position is that academic selection (grammar schools) should remain an option within the education system for those children whose abilities are suited to it but that all types of secondary school must be given equal priority in funding.

Health
The TUV opposed closure of residential care homes which had been operated by the NHS and they supported the retention of a mix of public and private sector residential care home provision. They believe that when there is a public inquiry into the response to COVID-19 pandemic in Northern Ireland, a key element should be the question of whether care homes were sufficiently protected from the virus. The TUV opposed mandatory vaccine passports and argued that the Northern Ireland government was too cautious in easing lockdown restrictions and that Northern Irish schools should have re-opened sooner than they did.

Brexit
The TUV strongly supported Brexit. Their grounds for doing so included an opposition to fiscal transfers from the UK to the European Union and, what they described as, the subordination of local labour market, trade and other laws to the supremacy of EU law. They are the only party in the Northern Ireland Assembly which wishes to see the Northern Ireland Protocol annulled.

Power sharing
A salient difference between the TUV and the other Northern Irish unionist parties is the TUV's consistent opposition to the arrangements for formation of government in Northern Ireland as prescribed by the Good Friday Agreement  and the subsequent St Andrews Agreement.

Northern Irish governments are formed via a type  of Consociationalist power-sharing termed 'mandatory coalition', and the government ministers who make up the Northern Ireland Executive are overseen by two First Ministers. In practice this has meant that one First Minister is appointed from amongst the unionist parties in the Assembly and the other First Minister from amongst the Irish nationalist parties. Furthermore, ministerial roles in the Northern Ireland Executive are apportioned (via the d'Hondt mathematical formula) to political parties according to their respective strengths in the Assembly. The TUV argues that these arrangements are not in the best interests of Northern Ireland because such a government will always consist of parties having political objectives which are opposites, and thus no common programme for government can be agreed upon. The TUV would prefer to see the formation of government via the 'voluntary coalition' model which operates in most democratic countries. Voluntary Coalition allows for any  group of parties in an Assembly to form a government provided that they can agree on a programme for government and can command a majority in the Assembly. In the event that no voluntary coalition could be negotiated, the TUV would prefer that Northern Ireland be governed from Westminster while retaining the Assembly and its associated committees - so-called 'legislative devolution'.

Election history

Local by-elections
The party's first electoral contest was the Dromore local government by-election for Banbridge District Council which took place on 13 February 2008 with its candidate being Dromore solicitor, Keith Harbinson. He took 19.5% of the first preference votes cast.

TUV was the last party to be eliminated, and more of its votes transferred to the Ulster Unionist Party (UUP) than to the Democratic Unionist Party (DUP), enabling the former to retain its seat.

At a Craigavon Borough Council local by-election in Lurgan on 14 January 2010, the TUV candidate won 19.3% of first preference votes. The UUP candidate, Jo-Anne Dobson, won with 63.9%. The DUP did not contest the seat.

2009 European Parliament election
Jim Allister, leader of TUV, contested the European Parliament election on 4 June 2009. He stood on a ticket of opposition to the DUP/Sinn Féin-led Northern Ireland Executive. The election turned out to be hotly contested, with the unionist vote split three ways. Sinn Féin's sitting MEP Bairbre de Brún topped the poll (a first for any Irish nationalist or republican candidate). The Ulster Conservative and Unionist candidate Jim Nicholson took the second seat, with Diane Dodds of the DUP coming in third place. TUV polled 66,000 votes. Jim Allister called the results a victory for unionism and indicated his intention to stand TUV candidates in future Northern Ireland Assembly and parliamentary elections. He additionally argued that the election represented the "depth of feeling that there is among many unionists who refuse to be rolled over in the era of Sinn Féin rule, who have quite rightly a resentment against those who betrayed them, deceived them, conned them, in the assembly election."

{| class="wikitable"
|-
! colspan="2" rowspan="2" | Party
! rowspan="2" | Candidate
! rowspan="2" | Seats
! rowspan="2" | Loss/GainFirst Preference Votes
! rowspan="2" | Seat
|-
! Number
! % of vote
|- style="text-align:right;font-weight: bold;"
| 
| Bairbre de Brún || 1 || 0 || 126,184 ||25.8 || 1st
|- style="text-align:right;font-weight: bold;"
| 
| Diane Dodds || 1 || 0 || 88,346 ||18.1 || 3rd
|- style="text-align:right;font-weight: bold;"
| 
| Jim Nicholson || 1 || 0 || 82,892 ||17.0 || 2nd
|- style="text-align:right;"
| 
| Alban Maginness || 0 || 0 || 78,489 || 16.1 || rowspan="5" |
|- style="text-align:right;"
| 
| Jim Allister || 0 || 0 || 66,197 ||13.5
|- style="text-align:right;"
| 
| Ian Parsley || 0 || 0 || 26,699 ||5.5
|- style="text-align:right;"
| 
| Steven Agnew || 0 || 0 || 15,764 ||3.2
|- style="text-align:right;"
|colspan=5|Turnout || 488,891 || 42.8 
|}

Source: RTÉ News

2010 Westminster general election
On 6 May at the 2010 general election for the Westminster parliament, TUV received 26,300 votes in the 10 constituencies it contested. In the same election, the DUP received 168,216 votes and the UCUNF received 102,361 votes. A week after the election the TUV acknowledged on its website that the outcome was disappointing given that none of its candidates were elected to Parliament.

2011 council elections
Traditional Unionist Voice fielded 41 candidates in the 2011 Northern Ireland local elections. It received 2% of the overall vote. Two TUV candidates were elected in Ballymena, and one each in Moyle, Ballymoney, Larne and Limavady.

2011 Northern Ireland Assembly election
The TUV fielded 12 candidates across 11 constituencies in the 2011 Northern Ireland Assembly election. They received 16,480 votes or 2.5% of the poll. Just one of their candidates was elected; Jim Allister in the North Antrim constituency , thus becoming the party's first MLA. Allister received 4,061 first preference votes (10.1%), and on the ninth and last count was deemed to be elected without reaching the quota of 5,760 votes.

2014 European Parliament election
In the 2014 European Parliament election, Jim Allister once again contested the Northern Ireland constituency for the TUV. On this occasion he polled 75,806 first preference votes, 12.1% of the total. This represented a large increase in number of votes compared to his 2009 European election score, although a decrease of just over one percentage point in terms of vote share. Allister was eliminated in the sixth of eight counts with Sinn Féin, the DUP and UUP all retaining their seats.

2014 council elections
In the 2014 Northern Ireland local elections (held on the same day as the European election) for the eleven new local councils in Northern Ireland, TUV candidates polled a total of 28,310 first preference votes, or 4.5%, an increase on the previous council elections. The party had 13 successful candidates. They achieved their largest number of councillors in Mid and East Antrim, where they became the third-largest party with five seats. They won three seats in Causeway Coast and Glens, two in Antrim and Newtownabbey and one each in Belfast, North Down and Ards and Lisburn and Castlereagh.

2015 United Kingdom general election
The party stood in seven constituencies in the 2015 general election, taking second in North Antrim but failing to place in the top four elsewhere.

2016 Northern Ireland Assembly election
The party stood 15 candidates in 14 constituencies in the 2016 Northern Ireland Assembly election, winning 23,776 first-preference votes (3.4% of the overall vote share). Jim Allister retained his seat in North Antrim, but the party was unable to gain any additional MLAs.

2017 Northern Ireland Assembly election
Jim Allister once again retained his North Antrim seat in the 2017 Northern Ireland Assembly election, taking 16% of first preference votes.

2017 United Kingdom general election
In 2017, the party stood a single candidate in the 2017 general election.

2019 United Kingdom general election
TUV chose not to stand any candidates in the 2019 general election.

2022 Northern Ireland Assembly election 
The TUV campaign for the 2022 Northern Ireland Assembly election prioritised a theme of opposition to the Northern Ireland Protocol. The party's candidates were designated on the ballot paper as representing "TUV - No Sea Border". For the first time in the party's history it stood a candidate in each of the 18 constituencies which elect the Northern Ireland Assembly.

TUV candidates won 65,788 first preference votes, more than three times the party's score in the 2017 Assembly election and 7.5% of the total first preference vote but only one of the 90 members elected to the new Northern Ireland Assembly was a TUV candidate; Jim Allister in the North Antrim constituency. Under the Single Transferable Vote system of proportional representation used in Northern Ireland a disproportionality between outcome in seats and first preference vote share can arise when a party is eliminated from the count because it has been less successful at obtaining lower preference votes on the ballot paper than at obtaining first preference votes.

{| class="wikitable"
|+  Summary of results for the NI Assembly election of May 2022
|-
! rowspan="2" | Party
! rowspan="2" | No. Seats
! rowspan="2" | Seats +/-First Preference Votes
|-
! Number
! % of vote
! votes in 2017 
|- style="text-align:left;"
| Sinn Féin
|  27 || 0 || 250,388 ||29.02% || 224,245
|- style="text-align:left;"
| Democratic Unionist Party
|  25 || -3 || 184,002 ||21.33% || 225,413
|- style="text-align:left;"
| Alliance Party of Northern Ireland
|   17 || +9 || 116,681 ||13.53% || 72,717
|- style="text-align:left;"
| Ulster Unionist Party
|   9 || -1 || 96,390 || 11.17% || 103,314  
|- style="text-align:left;"
| Social Democratic and Labour Party
|   8 || -4 || 78,237 || 9.07% || 95,958
|- style="text-align:left;"
| Independent
|   2 || +1 || 25,315 || 2.93% || 14,407
|- style="text-align:left;"
| style="color: Blue" | Traditional Unionist Voice                 
|   1 || 0 || 65,788 || 7.63% || 20,523
|- style="text-align:left;"
| People Before Profit
|   1 || 0 || 9,798 ||1.14% || 14,100
|- style="text-align:left;"
| Green Party in Northern Ireland
|   0 || -2 || 16,433 ||1.90% || 18,527
|- style="text-align:left;"
| Aontú
|   0 || 0 || 12,777 || 1.48% || *
|- style="text-align:left;"
| Others
|   0 || 0 || 6,894  || 0.8% || 14,111
|- style="text-align:left;"
|Total || 90 || * || 862,703 || 100% || * 
|}

Source: Ulster University CAIN archive

Source:

Controversies
In November 2009, the party caused controversy when it referred to the Irish language as "leprechaun language" in a press release, which criticised the Department of Education for "wasting" £47,000 on Irish translation. The initial press release was issued under the name of TUV vice-chairman Keith Harbinson. The party apologised and removed the phrase before the amended press release was posted on their website.

In December 2009, TUV member Trevor Collins organised a petition to release former Ulster Freedom Fighters (UFF) member Torrens Knight from prison, where he was serving a sentence for assaulting two women. Knight had previously served seven years imprisonment for taking part in the Greysteel massacre and Castlerock killings, but had been released early (in 2000) under the terms of the Good Friday Agreement. Because of his new conviction, the early release licence for his terrorist crimes was suspended. The TUV distanced itself from the petition, but was criticised for refusing to take action against Collins. Jim Allister replied that Collins had "acted in a misguided fashion" but said "there are people released from jail who were convicted of crimes in which people died and today they sit in our government".

In November 2012, Ballymena Borough TUV councillor and former player for the Ireland national rugby union team, Davy Tweed, was convicted of child sexual abuse between 1988 and 1995. Pending sentencing, he remained a TUV councillor. TUV stated that the sex offences related "to a period long before he was a member of this party". In January 2013, Tweed was sentenced to eight years' imprisonment. TUV chose one of its unsuccessful 2011 candidates, Timothy Gaston, to replace Tweed as councillor. Tweed's conviction was overturned in 2016 after a challenge by his lawyers on grounds that there were "flaws in how bad character evidence was put before the jury".

In 2014, Jolene Bunting became the first TUV councillor elected to Belfast City Council. It was then reported that she had posted sectarian "rants" against Catholics in 2011–2012. Bunting apologised for the online comments. She said that she did not regret their content, but regretted how they were written. In 2018, Bunting left the TUV, after claiming the party were preventing her standing as an Assembly candidate due to the earlier controversy.

In August 2021, the TUV defended its Assembly candidate for East Belfast, John Ross, who was criticised by the Bloody Sunday Trust (a registered charity) for comments he made about Bloody Sunday (1972), when fourteen unarmed Catholic civilians were shot dead by the Parachute Regiment. In April 2019, while addressing a protest for British Army veterans, Mr Ross had called Bloody Sunday "a very successful operation" by the paratroopers. The demonstration was part of UK-wide protests against the prosecution of British soldiers involved in the Troubles. The chair of the Trust said: "Bloody Sunday has been the subject of a meticulous public inquiry which found that all those killed and wounded were innocent" and asked TUV to re-consider whether Mr Ross was a suitable candidate. The TUV replied that there had been "various conflicting judicial findings". It also said Mr Ross's words had been taken out of context and that he would remain their candidate.

Leader

References

External links

2007 establishments in Northern Ireland
Conservative parties in Ireland
Conservative parties in the United Kingdom
Eurosceptic parties in Ireland
Eurosceptic parties in the United Kingdom
National conservative parties
Political parties established in 2007
Political parties in Northern Ireland
Social conservative parties
Ulster unionist organisations
Protestant political parties
Organisations that oppose LGBT rights in the United Kingdom
Ulster loyalist organisations